Maryse Dauvray was a French film actress of the silent era.

Selected filmography
 The Red Promenade (1914)
 Sharks (1917)
 J'accuse (1919)
 Lucile (1927)

References

Bibliography
 Waldman, Harry. Maurice Tourneur: The Life and Films. McFarland, 2001.

External links

Year of birth unknown
Year of death unknown
French film actresses
French silent film actresses
20th-century French actresses